Dagestanskiye Ogni (Dağıstan İşıqları) is a town in the Republic of Dagestan, Russia, located on the coast of the Caspian Sea,  south of Makhachkala. Population:

Administrative and municipal status
Within the framework of administrative divisions, it is incorporated as the Town of Dagestanskiye Ogni—an administrative unit with the status equal to that of the districts. As a municipal division, the Town of Dagestanskiye Ogni is incorporated as Dagestanskiye Ogni Urban Okrug.

Demographics
Ethnic groups (2002 census):
Tabasarans (35.5%)
Azerbaijani (26.3%)
Lezgins (22.2%)
Dargins (8.3%)
Aghuls (3.5%)
Russians (1.9%)

Climate
Dagestanskiye Ogni has a cold semi-arid climate (Köppen climate classification: BSk).

References

Notes

Sources

External links
Official website of Dagestanskiye Ogni  
Dagestanskiye Ogni Business Directory 

Cities and towns in Dagestan